The Cauchy convergence test is a method used to test infinite series for convergence. It relies on bounding sums of terms in the series. This convergence criterion is named after Augustin-Louis Cauchy who published it in his textbook Cours d'Analyse 1821.

Statement
A series  is convergent if and only if for every  there is a natural number N such that

holds for all n > N and all p ≥ 1.

Explanation

The test works because the space  of real numbers and the space  of complex numbers (with the metric given by the absolute value) are both complete. From here, the series is convergent if and only if the partial sums

 

are a Cauchy sequence.

This is because we need only show that its elements become arbitrarily close to each other after a finite progression in the sequence to prove the series converges.

Proof
We can use the results about convergence of the sequence of partial sums of the infinite series and apply them to the convergence of the infinite series itself. The Cauchy Criterion test is one such application.
For any real sequence , the above results on convergence imply that the infinite series

converges if and only if for every  there is a number N, such that m ≥ n ≥ N imply

Probably the most interesting part of this theorem is that the Cauchy condition implies the existence of the limit: this is indeed related to the completeness of the real line.
The Cauchy criterion can be generalized to a variety of situations, which can all be loosely summarized as "a vanishing oscillation condition is equivalent to convergence".

References 

Convergence tests